The New Hampshire Open is the New Hampshire state open golf tournament, open to both amateur and professional golfers. It is organized by the New Hampshire Golf Association. It has been played annually since 1932 at a variety of courses around the state.

Winners

2022 Ben Reichert
2021 Christopher Crawford
2020 No tournament due to COVID-19 pandemic
2019 Michael Kartrude
2018 Jason Thresher
2017 David Pastore
2016 Chris DeForest
2015 Grayson Murray
2014 Geoffrey Sisk
2013 Jesse Larson
2012 Dan McCarthy
2011 George Zolotas
2010 Scott Hawley
2009 Rob Oppenheim
2008 Michael Welch
2007 Rich Parker
2006 Mark Baldwin
2005 Rob Oppenheim
2004 Terry Hatch
2003 George Bradford
2002 Michael Hyland
2001 Shannon Sykora
2000 Mike Meehan
1999 Michael Adamson
1998 John Connelly
1997 Fran Quinn
1996 Hugh O'Neil
1995 Michael Muehr
1994 Kevin Giancola
1993 Joe Cioe
1992 Joe Cioe
1991 John Connelly
1990 Jeff Lewis
1989 Andy Morse
1988 Richard Parker
1987 Richard Parker
1986 Steve Jurgensen
1985 Eddie Kirby
1984 Tony Farmer
1983 Frank Fuhrer III
1982 Kirk Hanefeld
1981 Don Robertson
1980 George Lucas (amateur)
1979 Curt Madson
1978 Charles Smith
1977 Paul Barkhouse
1976 Ron Smith, Jr.
1975 Bryan Abbott
1974 Joseph F. Carr
1973 Wayne Levi
1972 Charles Volpone
1971 Dick Stranahan
1970 Cotton Dunn
1969 Paul Barkhouse
1968 Jim Browning
1967 Bruce Dobie
1966 Burt Page (amateur)
1965 Jim Browning
1964 Jay Dolan
1963 Bob Crowley
1962 Jim O'Leary
1961 Jim Browning
1960 Bill Ezinicki
1959 Bobby Locke
1958 Bill Ezinicki
1957 Bob Crowley
1956 Jim Browning
1955 Les Kennedy
1954 Phil Friel
1953 Tex McReynolds
1952 John Kent
1951 Don Hoenig (amateur)
1950 Jim Browning
1949 John Thoren
1948 John Thoren
1947 Tom Leonard, Jr. (amateur)
1946 Harry Nettelbladt
1942–1945 No tournament
1941 Tony Manero
1940 Ben Yasko
1939 Tony Manero and John Thoren (tie)
1938 Frank Walsh
1937 Tony Manero
1936 Harry Nettelbladt
1935 Dave Hackney
1934 A. Guay and Dave Hackney (tie)
1933 Jack Curley
1932 Gene Mosher

References

External links
New Hampshire Golf Association
List of winners

Golf in New Hampshire
State Open golf tournaments
Recurring sporting events established in 1932
1932 establishments in New Hampshire